The Artedidraconidae,  barbeled plunderfishes, are a family of marine ray-finned fishes, notothenioids belonging to the Perciform suborder Notothenioidei. The family comprises four genera. These fishes are endemic to deep waters off Antarctica.

Taxonomy
Artedidraconidae was first described as a family in 1988 by the American ichthyologist Richard Eakin with Artedidraco as its type genus, the type species of Artedidraco is A. mirus which was described in 1905 by the Swedish zoologist Einar Lönnberg. The genera in the family were previously classified as part of the Harpagiferidae. The family is classified within the suborder Notothenioidei  of the order Perciformes. The name of the family is a compound of Artedi, honouring the Swedish naturalist Peter Artedi who was known as the “father of ichthyology,” and who was born 200 years before Lönnberg described A. mirus  with draco, from dracœna meaning “dragon” an ancient Greek name for the weeverfish genus Trachinus , although this may be a reference to the relationship Lönnberg mentioned to Draconetta which was thought to be a member of the Nototheniidae at that time.

Genera
The following four genera are classified within the family Artedidraconidae:

 Artedidraco Lönnberg, 1905 
 Dolloidraco Roule, 1913
 Histiodraco Regan, 1914 
 Pogonophryne Regan, 1914

Artedidraconidae taxa are said to have undergone sympatric speciation.

Characteristics 
Artedidraconidae fishes are characterised by having a body tapering from their large heads to their caudal fins. They have 2 dorsal fins, the first contains 2-7 spines and the second has 22-30 segmented soft rays while the anal fin has 14-21 soft rays. They have large pectoral fins containing 14-21 fin rays while the pelvic fins are positioned at the jugular and contain a single long, sharp spine and 5 soft rays. There are 8-11 branched rays in the caudal fin. They have a large and protractile mouth with small conical teeth on the jaws but none elsewhere. The snout has a single nostril on each side. There is a flattened and hooked spine on the operculum. There are no scales on the head and body. There are two lateral lines, upper and middle. A mental barbel, i.e. on the chin, is a characteristic of this family; the morphology of this barbel is variable with the species. They have structures called convexitas superaxillaris, which are large spherical protrusions with an elastic feel on the body, situated just under the base of the pectoral fin; they may have a role in the system of cold resistance, secreting anti-freeze proteins and possibly a social function, expressing dominance.

Distribution, habitat and biology 
Artedidraconidae is found in the Southern Ocean where they occur in deeper waters around the continent of Antarctica and some sub Antarctic islands. These fishes are sluggish and sedentary and typically stay motionless on the substrate for long periods waiting for prey to come to them, normally peracarid crustaceans and polychaete worms.

References

 
Notothenioidei